Krakovany may refer to places:

Krakovany, Piešťany, a municipality and village in Slovakia
Krakovany (Kolín District), a municipality and village in the Czech Republic